Shaughnessy Village (sometimes referred to as the Concordia Ghetto) is a neighbourhood of Montreal, Quebec, Canada, located on the western side of the Ville-Marie borough. It is bounded by Guy Street to the east, Atwater Street to the west, Sherbrooke Street to the north, and René Lévesque Boulevard and the Ville-Marie Expressway to the south.

This neighbourhood is the most densely populated area of Quebec, due to the large number of high-rise apartment towers built in the 1960s and 1970s. The area is characterized by high-density residential housing and small-businesses, typically owned and operated by immigrants living in the neighbourhood, concentrated at its core, with stately Victorian grey-stone row houses and beaux-arts styled apartment blocks at the edges of the neighbourhood. It is a primarily institutional neighbourhood, with a university, junior college, seminary, hospital and architecture museum among many private schools, colleges and technical schools.

In 1981, local citizens named the neighbourhood after Shaughnessy House, built in 1874 for Thomas Shaughnessy, president of the Canadian Pacific Railway. The house was declared a National Historic Site of Canada in 1974, and is now part of the Canadian Centre for Architecture.

Other notable landmarks in the area include the Montreal Forum, the former site of the Montreal Children's Hospital on Atwater Avenue, and Le Faubourg Sainte-Catherine shopping mall and Cabot Square.

History

Prior to Expo '67 and the Olympics, this neighbourhood was considered the city's second Gay Village (mostly by anglophones).

Demographics
It is thus one of the more cosmopolitan neighbourhoods in the city, as well as being generally more English-speaking than the rest of Montreal. There is a sizeable population of Chinese-Canadians living in the area, so much so that part of the informally named Concordia Ghetto is also sometimes referred to as New Chinatown / Chinatown West. Much like Montreal's main Chinatown, it is pan-Asiatic, rather than uniquely Chinese.

The area is home to numerous small independently owned and operated restaurants, bars, bistros and cafés.

Public transit
The neighbourhood is served by two Montreal Metro stations. In the north of the neighbourhood, on the Green Line, Guy-Concordia and Atwater stations are located. The area is also well-served by numerous bus lines terminating at Atwater Station that connect Westmount, Côte-des-Neiges, and much of the rest of the urban core. The Claire-Morissette bike path on De Maisonneuve Boulevard cuts through the centre of the neighbourhood, and the area is well served by BIXI Montréal stations.

References

External links
  Shaughnessy Village - City of Montreal
 Shaughnessy Village Association
 Montrealbits.com:Shaughnessy Village
 Shaughnessy Village, A Historical Perspective

Neighbourhoods in Montreal
Student quarters
LGBT culture in Montreal
LGBT history in Canada
Gay villages in Canada
Ville-Marie, Montreal